Bairoko may refer to:

Bairoko Harbor, a harbor on the northwestern shore of the island of New Georgia in the Solomon Islands
The Battle of Bairoko, a World War II battle between American and Japanese forces on July 20, 1943, during the New Georgia campaign in the Solomon Islands
, a US Navy escort aircraft carrier in commission from July 1945 to April 1950 and from September 1950 to February 1955